Niro may refer to:

Niro (rapper), French rapper
Niro Group, originally A/S Niro Atomizer, Danish company acquired by GEA Process Engineering
Kia Niro, an automobile made by Kia Motors

See also
Robert De Niro